Iron-55 (55Fe) is a radioactive isotope of iron with a nucleus containing 26 protons and 29 neutrons. It decays by electron capture to manganese-55 and this process has a half-life of 2.737 years. The emitted X-rays can be used as an X-ray source for various scientific analysis methods, such as X-ray diffraction. Iron-55 is also a source for Auger electrons, which are produced during the decay.

Decay
Iron-55 decays via electron capture to manganese-55 with a half-life of 2.737 years. The electrons around the nucleus rapidly adjust themselves to the lowered charge without leaving their shell, and shortly thereafter the vacancy in the "K" shell left by the nuclear-captured electron is filled by an electron from a higher shell. The difference in energy is released by emitting Auger electrons of 5.19 keV, with a probability of about 60%, K-alpha-1 X-rays with energy of 5.89875 keV and a probability about 16.2%, K-alpha-2 X-rays with energy of 5.88765 keV and a probability of about 8.2%, or K-beta X-rays with nominal energy of 6.49045 keV and a probability about 2.85%. The energies of the K-alpha-1 and -2 X-rays are so similar that they are often specified as mono-energetic radiation with 5.9 keV photon energy. Its probability is about 28%. The remaining 12% is accounted for by lower-energy Auger electrons and a few photons from other, minor transitions.

Use
The K-alpha X-rays emitted by the manganese-55 after the electron capture have been used as a laboratory source of X-rays in various X-ray scattering techniques. The advantages of the emitted X-rays are that they are monochromatic and are continuously produced over a years-long period. No electrical power is needed for this emission, which is ideal for portable X-ray instruments, such as X-ray fluorescence instruments. The ExoMars mission of ESA used, in 2016, such an iron-55 source for its combined X-ray diffraction/X-ray fluorescence spectrometer. The 2011 Mars mission MSL used a functionally similar spectrometer, but with a traditional, electrically powered X-ray source.

The Auger electrons can be applied in electron capture detectors for gas chromatography. The more widely used nickel-63 sources provide electrons from beta decay.

Occurrence
Iron-55 is most effectively produced by irradiation of iron with neutrons. The reaction (54Fe(n,γ)55Fe and 56Fe(n,2n)55Fe) of the two most abundant isotopes iron-54 and iron-56 with neutrons yields iron-55. Most of the observed iron-55 is produced in these irradiation reactions, and it is not a primary fission product. 
As a result of atmospheric nuclear tests in the 1950s, and until the test ban in 1963, considerable amounts of iron-55 have been released into the biosphere. People close to the test ranges, for example Iñupiat (Alaska Natives) and inhabitants of the Marshall Islands, accumulated significant amounts of radioactive iron. However, the short half-life and the test ban decreased, within several years, the available amount of iron-55 nearly to the pre-nuclear test levels.

References

See also
Isotopes of iron

Isotopes of iron